San Xavier may refer to:
 Francis Xavier (1506–1552), Roman Catholic missionary
 San Javier, Ñuflo de Chávez, Santa Cruz Department, Bolivia
 San Xavier, Arizona, a town
 San Xavier Indian Reservation, near Tucson, Arizona, United States
 Mission San Xavier del Bac, a historic Spanish Catholic mission on San Xavier Indian Reservation
 San Xavier talus snail or Sonorella eremita, a species of air-breathing land snail

See also 
 San Javier (disambiguation)
 St. Xavier (disambiguation)